The 2011–12 Binghamton Bearcats men's basketball team represented Binghamton University during the 2011–12 NCAA Division I men's basketball season. The Bearcats, led by third-year head coach Mark Macon, played their home games at the Binghamton University Events Center in Vestal, New York as members of the America East Conference.

The team finished with a record of 2–29, the worst in program history, and finished last in America East play with a 1–15 conference record. Binghamton began the season by losing 26 consecutive games and were the final remaining winless team in Division I. The Bearcats ended the regular season at 1–28. They defeated UMBC in the first round of the 2012 America East men's basketball tournament before losing to Stony Brook to end their season. The Bearcats' .065 winning percentage ranked 343rd out of 344 Division I programs, ahead of just Towson's 1–31 (.031) record.

In the aftermath of the Bearcats' historically inept season, Macon was fired and replaced by Tommy Dempsey. Freshman forward Ben Dickinson and freshman guard Chris Longoria both transferred to other programs as a result.

Previous season 
In Mark Macon's second season as Binghamton head coach, the Bearcats struggled to remain competitive following the fallout from the scandal. The team finished 8–23, tied for eighth in the America East with a 4–12 conference record. The Bearcats earned the ninth seed in the 2011 America East men's basketball tournament, beating eighth-seeded UMBC 91–65 in the first round before losing to Vermont 57–46 in the semifinals.

Roster 

Note: Senior Kyrie Sutton, the last remaining player from Binghamton's 2009 champion squad, was dismissed from the team in November after he was arrested for the misdemeanor of criminal possession of stolen property.

Schedule 

|-
!colspan=12 style=|Exhibition

|-
!colspan=12 style=|Non-Conference Regular Season

|-
!colspan=12 style=|America East Regular Season

|-
!colspan=12 style=|America East Tournament

References 

Binghamton Bearcats men's basketball seasons
Binghamton
Bingham Bear
Bingham Bear